In mathematics, more precisely, in the theory of simplicial sets, the Dold–Kan correspondence (named after Albrecht Dold and Daniel Kan) states that there is an equivalence between the category of (nonnegatively graded) chain complexes and the category of simplicial abelian groups. Moreover, under the equivalence, the th homology group of a chain complex is the th homotopy group of the corresponding simplicial abelian group, and a chain homotopy corresponds to a simplicial homotopy. (In fact, the correspondence preserves the respective standard model structures.) 

Example: Let C be a chain complex that has an abelian group A in degree n and zero in all other degrees. Then the corresponding simplicial group is the Eilenberg–MacLane space .

There is also an ∞-category-version of the Dold–Kan correspondence.

The book "Nonabelian Algebraic Topology" cited below has a Section 14.8 on cubical versions of the Dold–Kan theorem, and relates them to a previous equivalence of categories between cubical omega-groupoids and crossed complexes, which is fundamental to the work of that book.

Detailed construction 
The Dold-Kan correspondence between the category sAb of simplicial abelian groups and the category Ch≥0(Ab) of nonnegatively graded chain complexes can be constructed explicitly through a pair of functorspg 149 so that the compositions of these functors are naturally isomorphic to the respective identity functors. The first functor is the normalized chain complex functorand the second functor is the "simplicialization" functorconstructing a simplicial abelian group from a chain complex.

Normalized chain complex 
This is because the definition of  gives .

Now, composing these differentials gives a commutative diagramand the composition map . Because a simplicial abelian group is a functorand morphisms  are given by natural transformations, meaning the maps of the simplicial identities still hold, the normalized chain complex construction is functorial.

References

Further reading 
Jacob Lurie, DAG-I

External links 

Simplicial sets
Theorems in abstract algebra